Pilimyia   is a genus of tachinid flies in the family Tachinidae.

Species
Pilimyia lasiophthalma Malloch, 1930
Pilimyia lateralis (Macquart, 1846)

References

Diptera of Australasia
Exoristinae
Tachinidae genera
Taxa named by John Russell Malloch